Paul William Fleming (born 1988) is a British trade union leader.

Born in Birmingham, West Midlands, Fleming was the first member of his family to attend university, studying philosophy, politics and economics at Mansfield College, Oxford.  He then worked as Acting Press Secretary for the New Jersey Democratic Party, before becoming the youngest ever organiser for the Community trade union.

In 2014, Fleming was elected to the London Borough of Southwark council, for the Labour Party.  He started working for Equity in 2011, and by the end of the decade was the union's Central London Theatres organiser.

In July 2020, Fleming was elected as general secretary of Equity, winning 69% of the vote on a 16% turnout.  On his election, he was described as "the first LGBTQ+ General Secretary of a major UK trade union".

References

1988 births
Living people
Alumni of Mansfield College, Oxford
Councillors in the London Borough of Southwark
General Secretaries of Equity (trade union)
Labour Party (UK) councillors
English LGBT people
Members of the General Council of the Trades Union Congress
People from Birmingham, West Midlands